Wilhelm Gratschow (born 18 October 1982 in Tashkent) is a German amateur boxer who qualified for the 2008 Olympics.

Career
Gratschow started as a bantamweight and became German Champion in 2004, in 2005 he lost in the semifinal. He failed to qualify for the 2004 Summer Olympics by ending up in third place at the 1st AIBA European 2004 Olympic Qualifying Tournament in Plovdiv, Bulgaria. He won bantamweight bronze at the so-called EU-championships after losing to Detelin Dalakliev. Starting with 2006 he competed at featherweight. At the end of 2007 he became German Champion at featherweight and was sent to the qualifier. After being beaten by Azerbaijani boxer Shanin Imranov in the semi final of a European qualifying tournament he qualified for the Olympics by defeating English boxer Stephen Smith in the third place box off.

External links
Olympic qualifier
AIBA results for Olympic qualification.
sports-reference

References

1982 births
Living people
Featherweight boxers
Boxers at the 2008 Summer Olympics
Olympic boxers of Germany
Uzbekistani emigrants to Germany
Sportspeople from Tashkent
Russian and Soviet-German people
Uzbekistani people of German descent
Citizens of Germany through descent
German male boxers